Indonesian National Route 14 starts from Semarang on the north coast of Java and ends at Yogyakarta to the south.

It passes through spectacular mountain scenery as it proceeds  through the Kedu Plain between the Merapi - Merbabu complex to the east, and Sumbing to the west.

Route
Semarang – Ungaran – Bergas - Bawen – Ambarawa - Jambu - Pringsurat – Secang – Magelang – Mertoyudan - Muntilan – Salam - Sleman – Yogyakarta

Description
It passes the city of Salak Fruit, Sleman. Near Mungkid, Central Java, this highway provides an entrance to Mendut and Borobudur Temples, and then the highway enters Magelang.

In Secang, Indonesian National Route 9 leading for Purwokerto diverges. After that it passes Bedono, where the Pesantren of Miftahul Jannah, owned by Pujiono Cahyo Widianto (better known as Syekh Puji), a controversial ulema and entrepreneur, is located.
The highway also provides a way to view scenic Ambarawa and Rawa Pening. This National highway ends at Semarang, which is known for its Lawang Sewu, Bandeng Fish and lunpia.

The route of the former railway from Yogyakarta to Magelang runs close to the highway route, and in places former railway bridges and railway lines can be seen.

Notes

14
Transport in Central Java
Transport in the Special Region of Yogyakarta